Florentino L. Broce, nicknamed Ponti Broce, (c. 1943 – 18 December 2015) was a Filipino footballer and coach. He played for the Philippine national football team. He was head coach of the national team from 1973–1974.

Broce graduated grade school from the University of Saint La Salle (Bacolod City) and then attended De La Salle University for his high school and college studies. He graduated from high school in 1962 and attained (LIA-COM) Bachelor of Science in Business Administration in 1967. Broce went to pursue further studies in Universidad Central de Madrid from 1969 to 1972. He was inducted to the Sports Hall of Fame by De La Salle in 1997. He was also awarded at the first Negros Occidental Football Night held on June 6, 2006 along with other Negrense players.

Broce died on 18 December 2015 at the age of 72.

References

Filipino footballers
Philippines international footballers
Footballers from Negros Occidental
Philippines national football team managers
1943 births
2015 deaths
De La Salle University alumni
Association footballers not categorized by position
Filipino football head coaches